Pomander Walk is a 1910 historical comedy play by the British writer Louis N. Parker.

It premiered at the Theatre Royal, Toronto before transferring to Broadway where it ran for 143 performances at Wallack's Theatre. It also ran for 43 performances at the Playhouse Theatre in London's West End theatre in 1911, with a cast that included Reginald Owen, Frederick Culley, Winifred Emery and Margery Maude. It is set in a row of houses in Chiswick during the reign of George III. Pomander Walk in Manhattan is named after the play.

References

Bibliography
 Wearing, J.P. The London Stage 1910-1919: A Calendar of Productions, Performers, and Personnel..  Rowman & Littlefield, 2013.

External links
 

1910 plays
Broadway plays
West End plays
Comedy plays
Plays by Louis N. Parker
Plays set in London
Plays set in the 18th century